The Posco Tower-Songdo or Northeast Asia Trade Tower (Korean: 포스코타워-송도) is a skyscraper in Songdo International City, the world's most expensive private real estate project in the Incheon Free Economic Zone, South Korea. The  building is currently South Korea's fourth tallest, and has 68 floors. It surpassed the previous record-holder, Samsung Tower Palace 3 – Tower G in Seoul, when it topped-out in 2009. Although finished in 2011, the completion of its interior had been delayed due to financial complications during a recession. It was surpassed in height in 2017 by the current highest building in South Korea, the Lotte World Tower.

The building was intended to be a landmark of the Songdo International Business District which was constructed on unused land along the waterfront near Incheon. It features 19 floors of class A office space, an observatory on the 65th-floor, a luxury hotel, serviced residences, and retail stores. The column-free floors include an office lobby at ground level with French limestone floors and Vermont slate stone walls.

Design
Like the One World Trade Center, the tower features a faceted glass facade that gently tapers from a square base but transitions to a triangular rooftop. The offices, apartments and a hotel each have their own entrance lobby. The facade is made of high-performance glazed glass with exterior shading devices which allows the structure to regulate internal temperatures. The tower also features low-flow plumbing fixtures allowing reduced water usage by more than 20 percent compared to the average consumption rate of a typical office building. In addition, a graywater collection system is used to flush wastewater while collected stormwater is stored and reused, reducing water consumption by more than 50 percent.

Amenities
The building is next to Songdo Convensia, the Riverstone shopping center, and the Sheraton Incheon Hotel. It has an extensive parking station next door, and will have pedestrian access to a future subway station.

Floors 2 to 33 are occupied by several businesses, with Daewoo occupying levels 9 to 21. The 36th and 37th floors are allocated for banquets, restaurants, meeting rooms and other formal activities, while floors 38 to 64 features a residence hotel with 423 guest rooms, including a penthouse on the upper floor. In February 2010, the 65th-floor observatory temporarily opened to the public for the G-20 major economies meeting of finance ministers.

References

External links
 Northeast Asia Trade Tower on CTBUH Skyscraper Center

POSCO
Office buildings completed in 2011
Residential buildings completed in 2011
Kohn Pedersen Fox buildings
Songdo International Business District
Skyscrapers in Incheon
Residential skyscrapers in South Korea
Skyscraper office buildings in South Korea
Skyscraper hotels in South Korea
2011 establishments in South Korea